"A Love Worth Waiting For" is a song by Welsh singer Shakin' Stevens, released in March 1984 as the fourth single from his album The Bop Won't Stop. It peaked at number 2 on the UK Singles Chart for two weeks and was certified silver in the UK by the BPI.

Reception 

Reviewing the song for Record Mirror, Culture Club's Roy Hay wrote that "the production sounds quite good, and the pizzicato strings are fun, but after the last one with Bonnie and the strings on that, what is Shaky doing, we ask ourselves? I'm not very impressed, I wouldn't have though this was Top 10 – it's too soft for him". Peter Martin for Smash Hits wrote that the song "sounds like it's about 30 years old. A flimsy song all about everlasting love with plucked strings and warbly vocals a-go-go. A real sickener.

Track listings 
7": Epic / A 4291 (UK)

 "A Love Worth Waiting For" – 3:20
 "As Long As" (Live) – 3:08

7": Epic / 34-04558 (US)

 "A Love Worth Waiting For" – 3:21
 "Why Do You Treat Me This Way?" – 2:27

7": Epic / EN5640 (South Africa)

 "A Love Worth Waiting For" – 3:20
 "Cry Just a Little Bit" – 3:11

12": Epic / TA 4291 (UK)

 "A Love Worth Waiting For" – 3:20
 "Don't Tell Me We're Through" (Live) – 5:46
 "As Long As" (Live) – 3:08

Charts

Certifications

References 

1984 singles
1984 songs
Shakin' Stevens songs
Epic Records singles